The penis is the male sex organ.

 Human penis

Penis or PENIS may also refer to:

 Proton-enhanced nuclear induction spectroscopy
 Penis Park (Haesindang Park), on the east coast of South Korea
 Penis Song, by Monty Python

Biology
 Penis fish (disambiguation)
 Urechis caupo, a species of spoon worm in North America
 Urechis unicinctus, a species of spoon worm in East Asia
 Penis plant, several plants
 Penis snake (Atretochoana)
 Penis worm (Priapulida)

See also
 Penes (disambiguation)